Ithell Colquhoun ( 9 October 1906 – 11 April 1988) was a British painter, occultist, poet and author. Stylistically her artwork was affiliated with surrealism.  In the late 1930s, Colquhoun was part of the British Surrealist Group before being expelled because she refused to renounce her association with occult groups.

Colquhoun was born in Shillong, Eastern Bengal and Assam, British India, but brought up in the United Kingdom.  After studying at the Slade School of Art, she lived briefly in Paris before moving back to London.  She spent the latter part of her life in Cornwall, where she died in 1988.

Biography
Margaret Ithell Colquhoun was born in Shillong, Eastern Bengal and Assam, British India, the daughter of Henry Archibald Colebrooke Colquhoun and Georgia Frances Ithell Manley.  Colquhoun was educated in Rodwell, near Weymouth, Dorset, before attending Cheltenham Ladies' College.  She became interested in occultism aged 17, after reading about Aleister Crowley's Abbey of Thelema.
Colquhoun studied from 1925 at Cheltenham School of Art, and at Slade School of Art in London from October 1927, where she was taught by Henry Tonks and Randolph Schwabe.  While at the Slade, she joined G.R.S. Mead's Quest Society, and in 1930 published her first article, "The Prose of Alchemy", in the society's journal.  In 1929, Colquhoun received the Slade's Summer Composition Prize for her painting Judith Showing the Head of Holofernes, and in 1931 it was exhibited in the Royal Academy.  Despite her studies at the Slade, Colquhoun was primarily a self-taught artist.

After leaving the Slade in 1931, Colquhoun spent several years traveling.  She established a studio in Paris, where she first encountered surrealism, reading Peter Neagoe's essay What is Surrealism?  During the 1930s she also spent time in Greece, Corsica, and Tenerife.  While in Greece, Colquhoun met and became infatuated with a woman, Andromache "Kyria" Kazou, who was the subject of several drawings and paintings and an unpublished manuscript, "Lesbian Shore".  Kazou appears to have visited Colquhoun in Paris, and Colquhoun later invited her to move to London so they could live together, though Kazou never did so. 

Colquhoun exhibited three paintings in Paris in 1933, and one work at the Royal Society of Scotland in 1934.  In 1936, she had her first solo exhibition at the Cheltenham Art Gallery, where she showed 91 works.  A solo exhibition at the Fine Art Society in London followed in the same year. 

Colquhoun's interest in surrealism deepened after seeing Salvador Dalí lecture at the 1936 International Exhibition of Surrealism in London.  In 1937 she joined the Artists' International Association, and in the late 1930s she became increasingly associated with the surrealist movement in Britain, writing three articles for the London Bulletin in 1938 and 1939, visiting André Breton in Paris in 1939, and joining the British Surrealist Group in the same year.  Also in 1939, she exhibited with Roland Penrose at the Mayor Gallery, showing 14 oil paintings and two objects.  After only a year as a member of the British Surrealist Group, Colquhoun was expelled in 1940, due to her refusal to comply with E.L.T. Mesens' demands that the surrealists should not be members of any other groups, which Colquhoun felt would interfere with her studies of occultism.  This led to Colquhoun's exclusion from other exhibitions organised by the British surrealists, but she continued to work with surrealist principles.

In the 1940s, Colquhoun met and began a relationship with the Russian-born Italian artist and critic Toni del Renzio.  Though he criticised her art as "sterile abstractions" in an essay in his magazine Arson in March 1942, he soon moved in with her flat, and in December that year she exhibited at a show at the International Art Centre, London, organised by del Renzio.  They married in 1943.  According to Eric Ratcliffe, their studio in Bedford Park, London, became an open house for friends, other artists and like-minded individuals. The marriage later became unhappy and they divorced – "acrimoniously", according to Matthew Gale – in 1947. From 1945, Colquhoun lived and worked in Parkhill Road, Hampstead.

In 1946, Colquhoun bought a studio near Penzance in Cornwall, and divided her time between there and London; in 1957 she moved to Paul, Cornwall.  She remained in Cornwall for the rest of her life.

She had solo exhibitions in 1947 at the Mayor Gallery, in 1972 at Exeter Museum and Art Gallery, and in 1976 at the Newlyn Orion Gallery.

Colquhoun continued producing art until around 1983.  She spent her final years in a care-home in Lamorna, and died in 1988.  She left the copyright in her works to The Samaritans, her occult work to the Tate, and her other art to the National Trust.  In 2019, the Tate acquired the National Trust's holdings of Colquhoun's works.

Art

Though only formally involved with the surrealist movement in England for a few years, Colquhoun first gained her reputation as a surrealist, and identified as a surrealist for the rest of her life.  She used many automatic techniques, which were described in André Breton's first surrealist manifesto as a defining feature of surrealism, and invented several automatic techniques herself.

Colquhoun had an early interest in biology, and studies of plants and flowers were a recurring theme in her art throughout her life.  Many of her early notebooks contained very detailed drawings of plants, and her early works included a series of enlarged images of flora, occupying the full canvas and painted almost photographically.

Colquhoun's work also often explored themes of sex and gender.  Her early work often depicts powerful women from myth and Bible stories, such as Judith Showing the Head of Holofernes 1929, and Susanna and the Elders 1930 – both of which are likely homages to Artemisia Gentileschi's works on the same themes.  Dawn Ades sees Colquhoun's treatment of gender as responding to the masculine and patriarchal themes in the art of other surrealists – for instance, where other surrealists drew landscapes as women, Colquhoun's Gouffres Amers 1939 shows a male body as a landscape.  Several of her works explore themes of castration and male impotence, including Gouffres Amers and The Pine Family, while she portrays female sexuality much more positively, such as in Scylla.

Stylistically, some her works have been described as "macabre" and "sinister". In 1939, she created the work Tepid Waters (Rivières Tièdes) which was displayed at her solo exhibition at the Mayor Gallery the same year. The painting, based on a church in Corsica, may allude to the Spanish Civil War.

In the 1940s, Colquhoun began to create works exploring the themes of consciousness and the subconscious. Her interest in psychology and dreams also attached her to the Surrealist movement.

Colquhoun began to experiment with automatic techniques in 1939, and used a wide range of materials and methods, such as decalcomania, fumage, frottage and collage. She developed new techniques such as superautomatism, stillomancy, parsemage, and entopic graphomania, writing about them in her article "The Mantic Stain". Automatism continued to be an important part of Colquhoun's artistic practice for the rest of her life, and following her split from the British surrealist movement it also became a key part of her spiritual activities. In 1948 she demonstrated automatic techniques on British television, on a BBC programme called The Eye of the Artist, and in 1951 she published another article, "Children of the Mantic Stain".

Three works which stand out during the 1940s are The Pine Family, which deals with dismemberment and castration, A Visitation which shows a flat heart shape with multicoloured beams of light and Dreaming Leaps, a homage to Sonia Araquistain.

Throughout the 1960s and 1970s, Colquhoun turned her attention towards collages rather than painting. The last retrospective of her work was held at the Newlyn Orion Gallery in 1976, which showed a large number of collages, many of which were according to Ratcliffe inspired by the collages of Kurt Schwitters.

Although initially acclaimed, art historians have noted that Colquhoun's reputation suffered during the war, a period when British surrealists such as E.L.T Mesens pamphleted against her former husband, Toni del Renzio.

Literary works 
Colquhoun was also a writer.

Between 1942 and 1944, she gave a number of poetry readings at the International Arts Centre in London, at events organised by Toni del Renzio.

In 1955 she published The Crying of the Wind, a travelogue containing some stylistically surreal passages about her journeys in Ireland and interest in Celtic history. In 1961, her book The Goose of Hermogenes was published.

In the 1980s, the art historian Dawn Ades described her early literary works as "like accounts of dreams in which a stream of narrative fantasy replaces the striking juxtapositions of images in Surrealist automatic texts".

She published poetry (Grimoire of the Entangled Thicket [1973], Osmazone [1983]) and tales of her travels in Ireland and Cornwall. Colquhoun also published a variety of critical writing and automatic prose on the London Bulletin, as well as essays on automatism such as "The Mantic Stain". The article discussed automatism in the British context, leading her to give a series of lectures in institutions in the early 1950s, such as at the Oxford Art Society, Cambridge Art Society and the Working Men's Institute.

In 1953, she appeared on the BBC television show Fantastic Art.

Reception and legacy
Colquhoun gained an early reputation within the British Surrealist movement, though in later years she became better known as an occultist.

Upon her death, Colquhoun left her occult work to Tate, and her other artistic belongings to the National Trust. In 2019 it was announced that more than 5,000 drawings, sketches, and commercial artworks by her had been transferred to Tate by the National Trust.

Although her work has largely been discussed in terms of its connection to Surrealism, Colquhoun sometimes stated her independence from the movement. In 1939, the same year she joined the English Surrealist group, she described herself as an 'independent artist' in a review for the London Bulletin.

Though Colquhoun was a relatively unknown artist by her death in 1988 by comparison with other British women surrealists such as Eileen Agar and Dorothea Tanning, more recently there has been renewed interest in her work from feminist and esoteric viewpoints. In 2012, the scholar Amy Hale noted that Colquhoun "is becoming recognized as one of the most interesting and prolific esoteric thinkers and artists of the twentieth century".
Hale argued that through Colquhoun's work "we can see an interplay of themes and movements which characterizes the trajectory of certain British subcultures ranging from Surrealism to the Earth Mysteries movement and also gives us a rare insight into the thoughts and processes of a working magician".

In 2020, Colquhoun's work featured in the British Surrealism exhibition at the Dulwich Picture Gallery.  In 2021, it was featured in the Phantoms of Surrealism show at Whitechapel Art Gallery, the Unsettling Landscapes exhibition at St Barbe Museum & Art Gallery, and was the focus of an exhibition at Unit London, Song of Songs.

Bibliography
Salvo for Russia, 1942 (contributor)
The Fortune Anthology, 1942 (contributor)
The Crying of the Wind: Ireland, 1955
The Living Stones: Cornwall, 1957
Goose of Hermogenes, 1961
Grimoire of the Entangled Thicket (1973) 
Sword Of Wisdom - MacGregor Mathers and the Golden Dawn, 1975
The Rosie Crucian Secrets: Their Excellent Method of Making Medicines of Metals Also Their Lawes and Mysteries, 1985 (provides introduction)
The Magical Writings of Ithell Colquhoun, 2007 (edited by Steve Nichols)
Ithell Colquhoun: Magician Born of Nature, 2009/2011 (by Richard Shillitoe)
I Saw Water: An Occult Novel and Other Selected Writings 2014 (with an introduction and notes by Richard Shillitoe and Mark Morrisson)
Decad of Intelligence, 2016
Taro as Colour, 2018
Medea's Charms: Selected Shorter Writing, 2019 (edited by Richard Shillitoe)

References

Footnotes

Sources

External links

 Official site
 Entry on Ithell Colquhoun at the World Religions and Spirituality Project
 Ithell Colquhoun at the Tate Gallery Archive
 Portrait of Ithell Colquhoun by Man Ray, 1932
 "Ithell Colquhoun: The Hidden Surrealist Gem" at Unit London

1906 births
1988 deaths
20th-century English women artists
20th-century English women writers
20th-century English painters
20th-century English non-fiction writers
Alumni of the Slade School of Fine Art
British surrealist artists
British surrealist writers
British women painters
English occult writers
English women non-fiction writers
People educated at Cheltenham Ladies' College
People from Shillong
Women surrealist artists
Writers from Meghalaya